Kiloni is a village the Mathura district in Uttar Pradesh state of India. This village is mostly inhabited by Jats while other castes include SCs and STs. Most of the Jats belong to Sikarwar gotra Some jats belong to Chaudhary gotra. The population of the village is about 2000. Most of the villagers use farming to earn their living. Potato is a staple crop. Because of scarcity of underground water, farming is getting tough these years. Yamuna Expressway, which will connect Noida to Taj Mahal City, Agra, passes through the fields of Kiloni village.

Kiloni is the second village on the road connecting Baldeo to Agra and lies towards Baldeo. This village lies in between Hathakauli and Patloni villages. There is a famous temple of Bijjo Baba near Kiloni village. Hundreds of people visit this temple every month 

Laftinent Naveen sikarwar ji born in this village.

See also
 Sikarwar
 Chaudhary

References

Villages in Mathura district